Ladislau Băcuț (also known as Ladislau Băcuț II; 12 November 1931 – 1996) was a Romanian football defender and manager. His brother, Gheorghe Băcuț was also a footballer, they played together at ITA Arad and Dinamo București.

Honours
UTA Arad
Divizia A: 1950
Cupa României runner-up: 1950
Dinamo București
Divizia A: 1955
Cupa României runner-up: 1954

References

External links
Ladislau Băcuț at Labtof.ro

1931 births
1996 deaths
Romanian footballers
Association football defenders
Liga I players
FC UTA Arad players
FC Dinamo București players
Romanian football managers
Sportspeople from Oradea